The Comical Revenge; Or, Love In A Tub is a 1664 comedy play by the English writer George Etherege. First staged by the Duke's Company, it premiered at the Lincoln's Inn Fields Theatre. It is one of the earliest Restoration Comedies.

The original cast included Thomas Betterton as Lord Beauford, Henry Harris as Sir Frederick Frollick, William Smith as Colonel Bruce, Henry Norris as Lovis, James Nokes as Sir Nicholas Cully, Cave Underhill as Palmer, Samuel Sandford as Wheadle, Mary Betterton as Graciana, Moll Davis as Aurelia and Jane Long as Widow.

References

Bibliography
 Fisk, Deborah Payne & Canfield, J. Douglas Cultural Readings of Restoration and Eighteenth-Century English Theater. University of Georgia Press, 2010.
 Van Lennep, W. The London Stage, 1660-1800: Volume One, 1660-1700. Southern Illinois University Press, 1960.

1664 plays
West End plays
Restoration comedy
Plays by George Etherege